The Canton of Mordelles is a former canton of France, in the Ille-et-Vilaine département, located in the centre-west of the department. It was disbanded following the French canton reorganisation which came into effect in March 2015. It consisted of 6 communes, and its population was 28,711 in 2012.

References

Former cantons of Ille-et-Vilaine
2015 disestablishments in France
States and territories disestablished in 2015
Brittany region articles needing translation from French Wikipedia